Quirine Lemoine and Arantxa Rus were the defending champions from the last time the tournament was held in 2017, but Lemoine chose not to participate this year. Rus played alongside Akgul Amanmuradova, but the pair lost in the first round to Elena Bogdan and Rosalie van der Hoek.

Misaki Doi and Natalia Vikhlyantseva won the title, defeating Alexa Guarachi and Danka Kovinić in the final, 7–5, 6–7(4–7), [10–7].

Seeds

Draw

Draw

References

External Links
 Main Draw

Swedish Open - Doubles
Swedish Open